Alamitos Beach is a coastal neighborhood in the southern portion of the city of Long Beach, California.  Although it was in unincorporated Los Angeles County when annexed by the City of Long Beach, it had been planned as its own community with a townsite.

Location
Alamitos Beach is bounded by Junipero Avenue on the east, Shoreline Drive and Alamitos Boulevard on the west, 4th Street on the north, and Ocean Boulevard on the south. Surrounding neighborhoods include the East Village Arts District to the west, North Alamitos Beach (NABA) and Hellman to the north and Bluff Park to the east, with a wide sandy beach along the Pacific Ocean to the south.

Climate
Due to its coastal location next to the Pacific Ocean, temperatures in Alamitos Beach are moderate throughout the year.  Heat and humidity rarely coincide, making heat waves more tolerable than they would be otherwise.  Temperature highs typically range from the low s in the summertime, s during the spring and fall, and s in the winter.

As in most locations in Southern California, rainfall occurs largely during the winter months. Storms can bring heavy rainfall, but Alamitos Beach receives less precipitation than locations adjacent to the San Gabriel or San Bernardino mountains further inland, whose rainfall is enhanced by orographic lift.

Characteristics

The coastal neighborhood is mainly dense residential, with large condominium buildings along the beach and smaller condominiums, apartment buildings, and single family residences as one moves inland.  A public beach is within short walking distance of all residences with some buildings having direct access.  The beach includes the Long Beach bicycle path that starts at Shoreline Village and ends in the Belmont Shore neighborhood of Long Beach.  Beginning in 2009 bike lanes were added to 1st, 2nd, and 3rd St. as part of the Long Beach's citywide effort to become more bicycle friendly.  Perhaps not so coincidentally more bicycle shops have since opened around the area.

The neighborhood was laid out in the 1920s, and many of its buildings date back to that era. As a result, the experience of living here is to feel the human scale of its often-quaint two-story-building setting, and with many conveniences only a short walk away. The urban yet human-scale neighborhood makes this section of Long Beach unique among beach communities in Los Angeles and neighboring Orange Counties.

The historic Ebell Club is located in the district.

Nightlife
Alamitos Beach is known for its vibrant nightlife and for its significant LGBT community. The Broadway Corridor business district in Alamitos Beach is home to many well-established bars, restaurants, and other businesses that are mostly gay-owned and operated or cater especially to the Lesbian, Gay, Bisexual and Transgender community. Bars serving a largely LGBT clientele include The Paradise Piano Bar and Restaurant (closed April, 2018), The Brit Pub, The Mine Shaft, and Sweetwater Saloon.  The coffee houses and restaurants, which typically remain open until at least midnight, are "gay-friendly" but also serve a large straight clientele.  The 4th Street Corridor, along the constituting northern border of Alamitos Beach, is where bars like The V-Room and The Pike Bar & Fish Grill are located.  The shops and restaurants along Shoreline Village and the Pike are also within walking distance.

Events
Ocean Blvd is the home of many city events, including the Toyota Grand Prix, Long Beach Marathon, the Long Beach Pride Parade, and the Amgen Tour of California Bike Race to name a few.

Architecture

In popular culture
Alamitos Beach is seen in many movies and television shows including: Blow, The O.C., 

Lethal Weapon
 
and Dexter.

Politics
Alamitos Beach is part of Long Beach's 2nd Council district, and is represented by Councilwoman Jeannine Pearce.

Gallery

See also
Broadway Corridor, Long Beach, California
Rancho Los Alamitos
Neighborhoods of Long Beach, California

References

External links

Map of Alamitos Beach
Alamitos Beach Neighborhood Association

Neighborhoods in Long Beach, California